Gerardo Molina Ramírez (August 6, 1906 – March 29, 1991) was a Colombian Congressman who served in both chambers, a lawyer and professor who was dean of the National University of Colombia and of the Free University of Colombia. Molina finished fourth in the 1982 Colombian presidential election and received 82,858 votes. He belonged to Unidad Democrática de la Izquierda.

References

1906 births
1991 deaths
Members of the Chamber of Representatives of Colombia
Members of the Senate of Colombia
Academic staff of the Free University of Colombia